Angela Marie Mentink (née Marzetta; formerly Arlati; born October 18, 1972) is an American sports television personality and former softball and baseball player who is currently an anchor for Root Sports Northwest and co-anchor of the television program Mariners Live. Mentink played college softball at Washington, where she earned All-American honors and went on to play in a women's professional baseball league before becoming a sports broadcaster.

Early life and education
Born Angela Marie Marzetta in Norfolk, Virginia, Mentink grew up in a United States Navy family and attended multiple high schools, including Taft High School in Woodland Hills, California, and Fort Mill High School in Fort Mill, South Carolina, before graduating from Corona del Sol High School in Tempe, Arizona in 1990. Playing at linebacker and wingback, Mentink was the first girl at Taft to letter in football.

Softball career 
An outfielder, Mentink began her college softball career at Central Arizona College, earning first-team NJCAA All-American honors in 1992 and being part of two NJCAA national championship teams under coach Clint Myers. In college, she changed to hit left-handed to give her a faster time to first base.

She transferred to the University of Washington's inaugural Washington Huskies softball team. A third-team NFCA All-American honoree in 1994, Mentink became the first player in program history to earn both All-Pac-10 and All-American honors. She stole 59 bases in 63 attempts and hit .472 her junior year, both still school records as of 2019. Her career batting average of .429 is also a school record. She was the first softball player inducted into the Husky Hall of Fame, in 2001.

The US Olympic Softball team named Mentink as an alternate on the 1996 team, but she declined it to play for the Colorado Silver Bullets, the first women's professional baseball team since 1954. In 1995, her first year, she started 40 games for the Silver Bullets, hitting .221, and was paid $20,000 and unlimited Coors Light. In 1996, she hit .241, before retiring from her professional playing career.

In 1997, she served as an assistant softball coach for the University of Washington.

Broadcasting career
Mentink began her broadcasting career with Fox Sports Northwest (now Root Sports Northwest), first as an intern then in 1998 as a reporter covering the Seattle Mariners and Seattle Seahawks. She serves as co-anchor for "Mariners All Access", a pre- and post-game show on Root Sports Northwest. Then known as Angie Arlati, Mentink briefly remotely anchored the Detroit Sports Report for Fox Sports Detroit.

On August 30, 2021, Mentink became the first woman to be a color commentator during a Mariners television broadcast.

Personal 
In 2017, she was diagnosed with breast cancer. After treatment, she is cancer-free as of 2019. She remains an advocate for early detection.

She is married to Seattle Pacific University professor Jarrett Mentink, with whom she has two sons.

References 

1973 births
Living people
Major League Baseball broadcasters
American television personalities
American women television personalities
Women sports announcers
Seattle Mariners announcers
College football announcers
College basketball announcers in the United States
Washington Huskies softball players
Softball players from Arizona
Sportspeople from Tempe, Arizona
Central Arizona Vaqueros softball players
American female baseball players
Baseball players from Arizona
Baseball outfielders